The Masonic Temple in Grenada, Mississippi is a Classical Revival building from 1925. It was listed on the National Register of Historic Places in 1988.

It was designated a Mississippi Landmark in 2007.

The local Masonic lodge (Grenada Lodge No. 31) no longer meets in the building.

The City of Grenada purchased the building in 2007 thanks to a private donation of former State Senator John Keeton and his wife. Margaret.

References

Neoclassical architecture in Mississippi
Masonic buildings completed in 1925
Former Masonic buildings in Mississippi
Mississippi Landmarks
Clubhouses on the National Register of Historic Places in Mississippi
National Register of Historic Places in Grenada County, Mississippi